Lindsay Meek Anderson (2 September 1883 – 12 November 1962) was an Australian rules footballer who played with Melbourne in the Victorian Football League (VFL).

Notes

External links 

1883 births
People educated at Scotch College, Melbourne
Australian rules footballers from Melbourne
Melbourne Football Club players
1962 deaths